Thomas & Friends: Day of the Diesels is a 2011 British computer-animated adventure film and feature-length special of the British television series, Thomas & Friends. It is the first (and only) special to be a spin-off around a character from the series; so the star is Thomas' best friend Percy. The film is produced by HIT Entertainment and animated by Nitrogen Studios.

Plot
New engine, Belle extinguishes a fire, but runs out of water. Thomas and Percy take her to the Steamworks where Sir Topham Hatt congratulates her and says they need another fire engine. Belle suggests a road/rail hybrid fire engine she knows named Flynn and arrangements are made to bring him over from the Mainland. Thomas starts to spend more time with Belle and Flynn. Percy feels left out, as well as from everyone else, especially when Flynn takes his birth at Tidmouth sheds, next to Thomas. Percy is convinced by Diesel, to visit Diesel’s friend: Diesel 10, at the run-down dieselworks. Diesel 10 will be Percy's mentor and new best friend. Diesel 10 informs Percy that Sir Topham Hatt does not care about the state of the Dieselworks and Percy says he will ask Thomas. 

Flynn arrives on the island. Percy finds Thomas and tries to tell him about the Dieselworks, but Thomas disregards this as Sir Topham Hatt asked him to show Flynn around. Percy goes to the Dieselworks the next day and finds out that they lack a working crane. Percy tells the Steamworks crane Kevin about his dilemma. Percy takes Kevin to the Dieselworks and, Diesel 10 is happy to have a new crane.

Diesel 10 tells Percy to bring Thomas to the Dieselworks so he can pay full attention. Percy goes to Knapford the next day. Thomas tells Percy to inform Victor about moving Kevin. Victor leaves to inform Sir Topham Hatt. Percy returns to the Dieselworks followed by Thomas. Diesel 10 puts Thomas in the back shed and the diesels go to the Steamworks so they can take it over. Percy is horrified to learn that Diesel 10 has been using him the whole time, and that Thomas is his best friend and not Diesel 10. The diesels cause havoc inside the Steamworks. Percy goes back to the Dieselworks and finds a fire in the main shed; he races to the Rescue Centre for Belle and Flynn. They return to the Dieselworks where Thomas and Kevin are being held hostage.

Percy frees Thomas and Kevin, and Belle and Flynn successfully put out the fire. Thomas, Percy, and Kevin rally the other engines to take back the Steamworks. The steam engines promise Diesel 10 that they will help him fix the Dieselworks. Sir Topham Hatt arrives, and orders Diesel 10 to fix the damage. Percy, Thomas, and Kevin tell Sir Topham Hatt about the Dieselworks, and he says he had already been planning to fix it. The Dieselworks is fixed and Sir Topham Hatt reopens it, and Thomas and Percy remain best friends.

Voice cast

 Rupert Degas as Dart and Flynn
 Matt Wilkinson as Diesel 10
 Teresa Gallagher as Belle
 Keith Wickham as Den, Salty, Paxton, Norman, and Dowager Hatt
 Kerry Shale as 'Arry, Bert and Sidney

UK dub
 Ben Small as Thomas and Toby
 Keith Wickham as Edward, Henry, Gordon, James, Percy, Dowager Hatt and the Fat Controller
 Matt Wilkinson as Kevin, Stanley, Victor, Rocky, Cranky and Farmer McColl
 Teresa Gallagher as Belle, Emily, Mavis and Lady Hatt
 Kerry Shale as Diesel
 Michael Angelis as the Narrator

US dub 
 Martin Sherman as Thomas and Percy
 Kerry Shale as Henry, Gordon, James, Stanley, Kevin and Sir Topham Hatt
 Jules de Jongh as Emily, Mavis and Lady Hatt
 William Hope as Edward, Toby, Rocky and Farmer McColl
 David Bedella as Victor
 Glenn Wrage as Cranky
 Michael Brandon as Diesel and the Narrator

Reception
Renee Longstreet of Common Sense Media gave the film 3 stars out of 5, stating the film "offers standard Thomas fare".

References 

2011 animated films
2011 films
2011 computer-animated films
Thomas & Friends
Animated films about trains
British computer-animated films
Films directed by Greg Tiernan
Lionsgate animated films
Mattel Creations films
2010s children's animated films
2010s English-language films
2010s American films
2010s British films